The AA Valley District is a district in Region III of the Virginia High School League.  As the district's name implies, all the schools are located in the central part of the Shenandoah Valley of Virginia, along Interstate 81.  Most of the member schools are part of the Harrisonburg and Staunton areas.

Overview
In 2007, all of the Valley District member schools moved from Region II to Region III due to the growth of Region II and the realignment of the AA River Ridge District from Region III to Region IV.  In addition, the district split into two separate districts after the regional shift.  The Harrisonburg area schools (Broadway, Harrisonburg, Spotswood, and Turner Ashby) formed the AA Massanutten District.  The Staunton area schools (Fort Defiance, Lee, Rockbridge County, Stuarts Draft, and Waynesboro) formed the AA Southern Valley District.

In 2010, the VHSL reestablished the Valley District, with a few modifications from the prior configuration. The Massanutten District teams would were joined by Fort Defiance, Robert E. Lee, and Waynesboro from the Southern Valley District. Rockbridge County returned to the AA Blue Ridge District and Stuarts Draft moved down to the A Shenandoah District. The new Valley District became a member of Region III in the Fall of 2011.
 
Fort Defiance, Robert E. Lee, Spotswood, and Waynesboro are participants of VHSL Division 3, while Broadway, Harrisonburg, and Turner Ashby are participants of VHSL Division 4. The VHSL Divisional Alignments only are effective in Football, Boys Basketball, and Girls Basketball and the divisions are based upon school enrollment.

Recently, the VHSL released a new plan where Stuarts Draft High School would rejoin the Valley District in the start of the 2013 school year from the Group A Shenandoah District, giving the district 8 teams. The plan has not yet been approved, but likely will be.

Member schools in 2007 before the split
 Broadway High School (Virginia), Broadway, Virginia The Gobblers
 Fort Defiance High School, Fort Defiance, Virginia The Indians
 Harrisonburg High School, Harrisonburg, Virginia The Blue Streaks
 Robert E. Lee High School (Staunton), Staunton, Virginia The Fighting Leemen
 Rockbridge County High School, Lexington, Virginia The Wildcats
 Spotswood High School, Penn Laird, Virginia The Trailblazers
 Stuarts Draft High School, Stuarts Draft, Virginia The Cougars
 Turner Ashby High School, Bridgewater, Virginia The Knights
 Waynesboro High School, Waynesboro, Virginia The Little Giants

Member schools as of 2017
 Broadway High School (Virginia), Broadway, Virginia The Gobblers
 Fort Defiance High School, Fort Defiance, Virginia The Indians
 Harrisonburg High School, Harrisonburg, Virginia The Blue Streaks
 Rockbridge County High School, Lexington, Virginia The Wildcats
 Spotswood High School, Penn Laird, Virginia The Trailblazers
 Turner Ashby High School, Bridgewater, Virginia The Knights
 Waynesboro High School, Waynesboro, Virginia The Little Giants

District Titles
Golf
2011-Spotswood Regular Season & Tournament Champs
2012-Spotswood Regular Season & Tournament Champs
Football
2011-Broadway
2012- Robert E. Lee & Fort Defiance Regular Season Co-Champs
Boys Cross Country
2011-Spotswood
2012-Fort Defiance
Girls Cross County
2011-Fort Defiance
2012-Turner Ashby
Competition Cheerleading
2018-Spotswood
2011-Harrisonburg Regular Season Champs/Broadway Tournament Champs
2012-Harrisonburg Regular Season & Tournament Champs
Volleyball
2011-Fort Defiance Regular Season & Tournament Champs
2012-Turner Ashby Regular Season Champs/Fort Defiance Tournament Champs
Boys Basketball
2018-Spotswood
2012-Robert E. Lee Regular Season Champs/Broadway Tournament Champs
2013-Spotswood Regular Season & Tournament Champs
Girls Basketball
2018-Spotswood
2012-Robert E. Lee Regular Season Champs/Spotswood Tournament Champs
2013-Spotswood Regular Season & Tournament Champs
Boys Swim & Dive
2012-Turner Ashby
2013-Turner Ashby
Girls Swim & Dive
2012-Spotswood
2013-Spotswood
Boys Indoor Track
2012-Fort Defiance
2013-Turner Ashby
Girls Indoor Track
2012-Harrisonburg
2013-Harrisonburg
Wrestling
2012-Turner Ashby Regular Season & Tournament Champs
2013-Harrisonburg Regular Season Champs/Turner Ashby Tournament Champs
Baseball
2012-Spotswood Regular Season Champs/Broadway Tournament Champs
2013-Spotswood Regular Season & Tournament Champs
Softball
2012-Fort Defiance Regular Season & Tournament Champs
2013-Fort Defiance Tournament Champs
Boys Tennis
2012-Harrisonburg Regular Season & Tournament Champs
2013-Spotswood Regular Season & Tournament Champs
Girls Tennis
2012-Spotswood Regular Season & Tournament Champs
2013-Broadway Regular Season & Tournament Champs
Boys Soccer
2012-Harrisonburg Regular Season Champs/Spotswood Tournament Champs
2013-Turner Ashby Regular Season & Tournament Champs
Girls Soccer
2012-Spotswood Regular Season & Tournament Champs
2013-Harrisonburg Regular Season Champs/Broadway Tournament Champs
Boys Track & Field
2012-Turner Ashby
2013-Turner Ashby
Girls Track & Field
2012-Harrisonburg
2013-Turner Ashby

Regional Titles & Runner-Ups
2011-2012
Spotswood Boys Golf—Region 3 Runner-Up
Spotswood Boys Cross Country—Region 3 Runner-Up
Broadway Football—Region 3 Division 4 Champions
Turner Ashby Boys Swim & Dive—Region 3 Champions
Spotswood Girls Swim & Dive—Region 3 Champions
Robert E. Lee Girls Basketball- Region 3 Division 3 Champions
Broadway Girls Basketball- Region 3 Division 4 Champions
Spotswood Girls Tennis- Region 3 Runner-Up
Harrisonburg Boys Tennis- Region 3 Runner-Up
Spotswood Girls Soccer- Region 3 Runner-Up
Broadway Softball- Region 3 Champions
2012-2013
Spotswood Boys Golf—Region 3 Champions
Harrisonburg Cheerleading—Region 3 Champions
Spotswood Girls Swim & Dive—Region 3 Champions
Spotswood Boys Basketball—Region 3 Champions
Fort Defiance Boys Basketball—Region 3 Runner-Up
Spotswood Girls Basketball—Region 3 Champions
Broadway Girls Tennis—Region 3 Runner-Up
Spotswood Boys Tennis—Region 3 Runner-Up
2018-2019
Spotswood Girls Basketball-Region 3 Champions
Competition Cheer-Region 3 Champions

State Championships & Runner-Ups
2011-2012
Robert E. Lee Girls Basketball Division 3 State Champions
Broadway Softball AA State Runner-Up
Spotswood Girls Tennis AA State Runner-Up
2012-2013
Spotswood Golf AA State Runner-Up
Spotswood Girls Basketball Division 3 State Champions
Spotswood Boys Basketball Division State Runner-Up
2018-2019
Spotswood Girls Basketball State Champions

References 

Virginia High School League